The Cherenkov Telescope Array or CTA is a multinational, worldwide project to build a new generation of ground-based gamma-ray instrument in the energy range extending from some tens of GeV to about 300 TeV. It is proposed as an open observatory and will consist of two arrays of Imaging Atmospheric Cherenkov telescopes (IACTs), a first array at the Northern Hemisphere with emphasis on the study of extragalactic objects at the lowest possible energies, and a second array at the Southern Hemisphere, which is to cover the full energy range and concentrate on galactic sources. The physics program of CTA goes beyond high energy astrophysics into cosmology and fundamental physics.

Building on the technology of current generation ground-based gamma-ray detectors (MAGIC, HESS, and VERITAS), CTA will be ten times more sensitive and have unprecedented accuracy in its detection of high-energy gamma rays. Current gamma-ray telescope arrays host up to five individual telescopes, but CTA is designed to detect gamma rays over a larger area and a wider range of views with more than 100 telescopes located in the northern and southern hemispheres. At least three classes of telescopes are required to cover the full CTA energy range (20 GeV to 300 TeV): Large-Sized Telescope (LST), Medium-Sized Telescope (MST) and Small-Sized Telescope (SST).

The project to build CTA is well-advanced: prototypes exist for all the proposed telescope designs and significant site characterization and preparations are underway. An inter-governmental agreement for construction and subsequent operation of the observatory, a European Research Infrastructure Consortium (ERIC), is in preparation and the financial threshold is expected to be reached in 2019.

The project was promoted to a Landmark on the road-map of the European Strategy Forum on Research Infrastructures (ESFRI), and is on the roadmaps for the European Astroparticle Physics network ASPERA and the European Astrophysics network ASTRONET. The network is scheduled to start collecting data in 2022.

CTA Consortium Members and CTAO Shareholders 

As of December 2018, the CTA Consortium includes more than 1,420 members from 210 institutes in 31 countries: Armenia, Australia, Austria, Brazil, Bulgaria, Canada, Chile, Croatia, Czech Republic, Finland, France, Germany, Greece, India, Ireland, Italy, Japan, Mexico, Namibia, Netherlands, Norway, Poland, Slovenia, South Africa, Spain, Sweden, Switzerland, Thailand, the United Kingdom, Ukraine and the United States. The group of scientists and engineers are engaged in the scientific and technical development of CTA. Its internal authority, the Consortium Board, includes representatives from each of the Consortium institutes and is responsible for endorsing all major Consortium decisions.

The CTA Observatory gGmbH (CTAO gGmbH) is the legal entity for CTA in the preparation of the implementation of the CTA Observatory. The CTAO gGmbH works in close cooperation with the CTA Consortium. The CTAO is governed by the CTA Council, composed of shareholders from 11 countries (Australia, Austria, Czech Republic, France, Germany, Italy, Japan, Slovenia, Spain, Switzerland, United Kingdom) and associate members from two countries (Netherlands and South Africa).

Array Sites 

On 15 and 16 July 2015, the CTA decided to enter into detailed contract negotiations for hosting CTA on the European Southern Observatory (ESO) Paranal Observatory in Chile and at the Instituto de Astrofisica de Canarias (IAC), Roque de los Muchachos Observatory in La Palma, Spain. On 19 September 2016, the Council of the Cherenkov Telescope Array Observatory (CTAO) concluded negotiations with the IAC to host CTA's northern hemisphere array at the Roque de los Muchachos Observatory in La Palma, Spain. On 19 December 2018, the final agreements were signed for the southern array to be hosted near the ESO's Paranal Observatory in northern Chile.

CTA's southern hemisphere site is only 11 km southeast of the ESO's existing Paranal Observatory in the Atacama Desert in Chile, which is considered one of the driest and most isolated regions on earth – a paradise for stargazers.

CTA's northern hemisphere site is located on the existing site of the IAC's Roque de los Muchachos Observatory on the island of La Palma, the fifth largest island in the Canary Islands. At 2,200 metres altitude and nestled on a plateau below the rim of an extinct volcanic crater, the site currently hosts an operating gamma-ray observatory, the Major Atmospheric Gamma Ray Imaging Cherenkov (MAGIC) telescopes, as well as a wide variety of optical telescopes of various sizes.

Science 

CTA will look at higher energy photons than ever measured before. In fact, the cosmic particle accelerators can reach energies inaccessible to human-made accelerators like the Large Hadron Collider. CTA will seek to understand the impact of high-energy particles in the evolution of cosmic systems and to gain insight into the most extreme and unusual phenomena in the Universe. CTA will search for annihilating dark matter particles and deviations from Einstein's theory of special relativity and even conduct a census of particle acceleration in the Universe.

Research at the CTA will seek to address questions in and beyond astrophysics. These questions fall under three major themes of study: Understanding the Origin and Role of Relativistic Cosmic Particles, Probing Extreme Environments, Exploring Frontiers in Physics. To address these themes, CTA will observe the following key targets: Galactic Center, Large Magellanic Cloud, Galactic Plane, Galaxy Clusters, Cosmic Ray PeVatrons, Star Forming Systems, Active Galactic Nuclei, Transient Phenomena.

Access 
Unlike current instruments, CTA will be operated as a proposal-driven open observatory. Observations will be carried out by observatory operators, then the data will be calibrated, reduced and, together with analysis tools, made available to the principal investigator in FITS data format. After a proprietary period, data will be made openly available through the CTA data archive.

See also
Cherenkov radiation
List of telescope types
Major Atmospheric Cerenkov Experiment Telescope
Pavel Cherenkov

References

External links 
 Official web page of CTA
 Official web page of ESFRI
 Official website of ASPERA
 Official website of ASTRONET
 

Gamma-ray telescopes
Proposed telescopes
Astronomical instruments